Jim Mortimore is a British science fiction writer, who has written several spin-off novels for popular television series, principally Doctor Who, but also Farscape and Babylon 5.

When BBC Books cancelled his Doctor Who novel Campaign, he had it published independently and gave the proceeds to a charity – the Bristol Area Down's Syndrome Association. He is also the writer of the Big Finish Doctor Who audio play The Natural History of Fear and their Tomorrow People audio play Plague of Dreams. He has also done music for other Big Finish productions.

He released his first original novel in 2011, Skaldenland.

Doctor Who novels
Lucifer Rising (1993) (with Andy Lane)
Blood Heat (1993)
Parasite (1994)
Eternity Weeps (1997)
The Sword of Forever (1998) (a Bernice Summerfield novel)
Eye of Heaven (1998)
Beltempest (1998)
Campaign (2000) (published unofficially)

Cracker novels
The Mad Woman in the Attic (1994)
Men Should Weep (1995)
Brotherly Love (1996)

Other novels
Space Truckers (1996)
Babylon 5: Clark's Law (1996)
Farscape: Dark Side of the Sun (2000) – under pseudonym of Andrew Dymond
Skaldenland (2011, Obverse Books)

External links
Interview with Mortimore on Outpost Gallifrey
Downloadable PDF of Campaign

Year of birth missing (living people)
Living people
Writers of Doctor Who novels
21st-century British male writers
20th-century British male writers
20th-century British novelists
21st-century British novelists
British male novelists
British science fiction writers